Ragamuffin or Raggamuffin may refer to:

Film
 The Ragamuffin, a 1916 American silent film by William C. deMille
 Ragamuffin, a 2014 film directed by David Schultz about Rich Mullins

Music
 Raggamuffin music, or ragga, a reggae and dancehall subgenre
 Raggamuffin Music Festival, an annual touring festival in Australia and New Zealand
 Stephen Marley (musician) (born 1972), nicknamed Raggamuffin, Jamaican-American reggae musician
 "Raggamuffin" (song), a 2010 song by Selah Sue
 "Raggamuffin", a 2019 song by Koffee from Rapture
 Ragamuffin, a 1920 piano composition from London Pieces by John Ireland

Other uses
 Ragamuffin (novel), a 2007 novel by Tobias S. Buckell
 Ragamuffin cat, a breed of domestic cat
 Ragamuffin, a series of Australian racing yachts run by Syd Fischer
 Ragamuffin, a character in the comic book series Lenore, the Cute Little Dead Girl
 Ragamuffins, an English term for the farrapos in the Ragamuffin War in Rio Grande do Sul, Brazil, 1835–1845

See also